Nelson is a New Zealand parliamentary electorate, returning one Member of Parliament to the House of Representatives of New Zealand. From 1853 to 1860, the electorate was called Town of Nelson. From 1860 to 1881, it was City of Nelson. The electorate is the only one that has continuously existed since the 1st Parliament in 1853.

The current MP for Nelson is Rachel Boyack of the Labour Party after defeating long time incumbent Nick Smith of the National Party in the 2020 general election.

Population centres
Nelson is based around the city of Nelson, with the dormitory town of Richmond and the smaller community of Hope drafted in to bring the electorate up to the required population quota.

A significant adjustment to the electorate's boundaries was carried out ahead of the change to mixed-member proportional (MMP) voting in 1996; the decrease in South Island electorates from 25 to 16 lead to the abolition of one western South Island electorate; Tasman was split between West Coast and the then (geographically) much smaller Nelson electorate.

Brightwater was moved to West Coast-Tasman at the 2020 redistribution.

History
An electorate based around Nelson has been contested at every election since the first Parliament in 1853. Two of the original 24 electorates from the 1st Parliament still exist (New Plymouth is the other one), but Nelson is the only original electorate that has existed continuously.

The electorate was initially known as Town of Nelson. From 1866 to 1881, it was called City of Nelson. Since 1881, it has been known as simply Nelson.

From 1853 to 1881, Nelson was a two-member electorate. James Mackay and William Travers were the first two representatives elected in 1853. Travers and William Cautley (MP for Waimea) both resigned on 26 May 1854. Travers subsequently contested the seat that Cautley had vacated, being elected in the 21 June 1854 Waimea by-election. Samuel Stephens, who succeeded Travers in Nelson, died before the end of the first term, but the seat remained vacant.

Alfred Domett retired from politics at the end of the 3rd Parliament. Edward Stafford resigned in 1868 during the term of the 4th Parliament. Nathaniel Edwards won the resulting by-election. Martin Lightband resigned after a year in Parliament in 1872 and was succeeded by David Luckie.

Nelson became a single member electorate in 1881. Henry Levestam, who was first elected in an 1881 by-election to replace Adams was confirmed by the voters at the next three general elections (1881, 1884 and 1887), but he died in office on 11 February 1889.

He retired at the end of the parliamentary term in 1893 and was succeeded by John Graham, who with the  started a representation of the electorate that would last until his retirement in 1911.

The contest was won by Edgar Neale of the National Party. He held the electorate until 1957, when he retired.

This started Labour's dominance in the electorate, which was to last for four decades. Woollaston retired in 1990 and was succeeded by Labour's John Blincoe. Smith defeated Blincoe and held the seat until the 2020 election, when Labour's Rachel Boyack won the seat.

Despite a National Party candidate being elected for Nelson between 1996 and 2020, Labour has won the party vote in Nelson in all but three elections during the period (the three elections of the Fifth National Government). Nelson is also an electorate in which the Green Party performs better locally than the party does nationally. Combined, votes at the 2017 election for the Green Party candidate Matt Lawrey and Labour Party candidate Rachel Boyack would have been sufficient to unseat the incumbent Smith.

Members of Parliament

Key

multi-member electorate

single-member electorate

List MPs
Members of Parliament elected from party lists in elections where that person also unsuccessfully contested the Nelson electorate. Unless otherwise stated, all MPs terms began and ended at general elections.

Election results

2020 election

2017 election

2014 election

2011 election

Electorate (as at 26 November 2011): 46,817

2008 election

2005 election

2002 election

a United Future swing is compared to the 1999 results of United NZ and Future NZ, who merged in 2000.

1999 election

1996 election

1993 election

1990 election

1987 election

1984 election

1981 election

1978 election

1976 by-election

1975 election

1972 election

1969 election

1966 election

1963 election

1960 election

1957 election

1954 election

1951 election

1949 election

1946 election

1943 election

1938 election

1935 election

1931 election

1928 election

1925 election

1922 election

1919 election

1914 election

1911 election

 
 
 
 
 
 
 
 
|-
|style="background-color:#E9E9E9" ! colspan="6" style="text-align:left;" |Second ballot result
|-

 
 
 

1908 election

 
 
 
 
 
 
|-
|style="background-color:#E9E9E9" ! colspan="6" style="text-align:left;" |Second ballot result
|-

1905 election

1902 election

1899 election

1890 election

1889 by-election

1881 by-election

1879 by-election

1872 by-election

1868 by-election

Table footnotes

Notes

References

External links
Electorate Profile  Parliamentary Library

New Zealand electorates
Politics of Nelson, New Zealand
1853 establishments in New Zealand